Tingena melinella is a species of moth in the family Oecophoridae. It is endemic to New Zealand and has been observed in Nelson and Canterbury.

Taxonomy
This species was first described by Felder & Rogenhofer in 1875 and named Oecophora melinella. Felder & Rogenhofer used a specimen collected by T. R. Oxley in Nelson. George Hudson did not mention this species in his book The butterflies and moths of New Zealand. However he did discuss the subsequently synonymised species Borkhausenia freta. In 1988 J. S. Dugdale placed this species within the genus Tingena. In the same publication Dugdale synonymised Borkhausenia freta with T. melinella. The holotype specimen is held at the Natural History Museum, London.

Description

Hudson, describing the species B. freta, since synonymised with T. melinella, as follows:

Distribution 
This species is endemic to New Zealand. It has been observed in Nelson and in Canterbury.

References

Oecophoridae
Moths of New Zealand
Moths described in 1875
Endemic fauna of New Zealand
Taxa named by Baron Cajetan von Felder
Taxa named by Alois Friedrich Rogenhofer
Endemic moths of New Zealand